The 2010 NCAA National Collegiate Women's Ice Hockey Tournament involved eight schools in single-elimination play to determine the national champion of women's NCAA Division I college ice hockey. The quarterfinals were held at the home sites of the seeded teams and the Frozen Four was hosted by the University of Minnesota at Ridder Arena in Minneapolis, Minnesota.

Bracket
Quarterfinals held at home sites of seeded teams

Note: * denotes overtime period(s)

All-Tournament team
G Amanda Mazzotta, Cornell
D Laura Fortino, Cornell
D Lauriane Rougeau, Cornell
F Emmanuelle Blais, Minnesota Duluth
F Jessica Wong, Minnesota Duluth
F Laura Fridfinnson, Minnesota Duluth

Tournament notes
Saara Tuominen and Jaime Rasmussen of Minnesota Duluth were the only players to score two points in the championship game.

Two records were set in the championship game: at four hours and twenty-four minutes, the game set an NCAA Frozen Four record for longest game, and Cornell goaltender Amanda Mazzotta set a record for most saves in an NCAA Championship game with 61 saves. The former record holder was Bulldog goaltender Patricia Sautter, who set the previous record in 2003 with 41 saves.

References

NCAA Women's Ice Hockey Tournament

2010 in sports in Minnesota